Suhran may refer to:
 Suran, Sistan and Baluchestan